Sibuyan is a crescent-shaped island, the second largest in an archipelago comprising  Romblon Province, Philippines. The people speak the Sibuyanon dialect of Romblomanon, a Visayan language.

Sibuyan has been dubbed by some local and international natural scientists as "the Galápagos of Asia", because it has remained in isolation from the rest of the world since its formation. Never in its geological history has it ever been connected with any part of the Philippine archipelago. Seismic forces pushed up a  peak from the earth's crust, forming a series of smaller peaks and slopes. The peak is Mt. Guiting-Guiting (literally means "the saw-toothed mountain", in reference to its jagged ridge). Because of the steep slopes, much of its original forest remains untouched, and the rest is the island as we find it today.

Primary forests cover , which is 33% of the land area of Sibuyan. However, most of the lower altitude forest has been logged or is secondary. The park features a scenic landscape with twin towering peaks set amidst closed canopy forests. Its forests remain largely intact, and include the entire elevational gradient from lowland dipterocarp forest (at 200 to 900 m) and mangroves, through montane forest (above 700 m) to mossy forest, heathland and montane grassland around the peaks.

Political subdivision

The island is divided into three municipalities: Cajidiocan, Magdiwang, and San Fernando.

Biodiversity

Sibuyan has a rich biodiversity of flora and fauna. Exact figures on numbers of total plant species are hard to give, as biologists stumble upon species yet unidentified by the scientific community. In one study, the National Museum identified 1,551 trees in a single hectare, with 123 species of trees, and of this number, 54 are found nowhere else in the world. Hence, it has been proclaimed as one of the world's most diverse and dense forests. There are estimated to be 700 vascular plant species on the island. Nepenthes sibuyanensis, a pitcher plant species, is also endemic as its scientific name suggests. There are 131 species of birds and ten species of fruit bats, and many dwelling mammals, reptiles, and rodents yet to be fully catalogued. Three birds subspecies are endemic to Sibuyan: the Philippine hanging parrot (Loriculus philippensis bournsi), the Philippine Pygmy-woodpecker (Dendrocopos maculatus menagei), and the Orange-bellied Flowerpecker (Dicaeum trigonostigma sibuyanicum), all of which were recorded there in the early 1990s. Five species of threatened mammals, one fruit bat and four rodents, are endemic to Sibuyan, and the endangered fruit bat Nyctimene rabori occurs there.

An unspoiled ecosystem

Sibuyan Island has been said to be one of the most unspoiled ecosystems in the Philippines and the world. The water of the Cantingas River as well as most of the other smaller rivers and rivulets on the island was tested to be one of the best water quality for human consumption worldwide. The drinking water of Sibuyanons come direct and untreated from rivers, springs and holes drilled at mountain slopes or from the ground.

Mining activities
Mining operations in Sibuyan have started since 2005, when a barangay of San Fernando endorsed mining projects in their area, believing that this will create jobs for residents, although exploration of the area began as early as 1972. On October 3, 2007, Romblon town councilor Armin Marin was shot dead during an anti-mining protest against the operations of mining company Sibuyan Nickel Properties Development Corp. when a confrontation erupted between protesters and the firm's security guards.

The Sibuyanons Against Mining advocacy group, with the Sibuyan Island Sentinels League for Environment Inc. (Sibuyan ISLE), has been fighting for the conservation and protection of the island against mining activities considering its vast impact on the ecology, culture and society of the island.

2023 Altai Philippines Mining Corporation protest

In December 2022, the government issued a mineral ore export permit to the Altai Philippines Mining Corporation (APMC), allowing the company to bulk test 50,000 metric tons of ore. On January 2023, Sibuyan residents set up a barricade to protest APMC operations, saying the extraction of nickel ore will disrupt the island’s intact ecosystems. On February 3, 2023, according to the environmental advocacy organization Alyansa Tigil Mina (ATM), protesters formed a human barricade intended to stop APMC trucks carrying nickel ore from leaving the San Fernando port, but the trucks forced their way through the barricade. This prompted 30 policemen to intervene and disperse the residents.

On February 4, the Department of Environment and Natural Resources (DENR) served a notice to APMC stating that the company was found to be "constructing/operating a causeway project without an approved environmental compliance certificate". Two days later the company has voluntarily stopped all exploration and testing activities in the area, stating that they are committed to maintaining the "highest standards of environmental responsibility and community engagement". On February 8, DENR ordered a probe to conduct an investigation into the alleged damage of seagrass and other marine resources due to AMPC operations, and to take legal action for reportedly cutting trees without the necessary permit.

In a statement on February 10, the company said that it was "peacefully exercising its rights" under a 2009 agreement with DENR, and has appealed for due process, claiming it has been "maligned, unfairly judged, and prevented from performing its lawful activities".

Other events
On June 21, 2008, the passenger ferry MV Princess of the Stars of Sulpicio Lines (now Philippine Span Asia Carrier Corp.) capsized off the coast of the island in the height of Typhoon Frank. Of the 851 passengers, only 32 survived.

References

External links

 

Islands of Romblon